Claudio Ezequiel Mosca (born April 2, 1991 in Bernal, Argentina) is an Argentine footballer currently playing for Ferro Carril Oeste.

Club title

References
 
 

1991 births
Living people
Argentine footballers
Argentine expatriate footballers
Argentina under-20 international footballers
Association football midfielders
Sportspeople from Buenos Aires Province
Arsenal de Sarandí footballers
Nueva Chicago footballers
Santiago Morning footballers
Guillermo Brown footballers
San Martín de San Juan footballers
San Martín de Tucumán footballers
San Luis de Quillota footballers
Ferro Carril Oeste footballers
Primera B de Chile players
Argentine Primera División players
Primera Nacional players
Argentine expatriate sportspeople in Chile
Expatriate footballers in Chile